Millett Hall is a basketball arena in Oxford, Ohio. It is home to the Miami University men's and women's basketball, and women's volleyball teams. It is also the home of the ROTC program and various university events. It is named after Miami University's 16th President John D. Millett. The original construction cost was approximately $7.5 million. It is located on the northern part of Miami's campus, near Yager Stadium. The arena opened its doors on December 2, 1968, against Adolph Rupp's Kentucky Wildcats. A crowd of 9,135 saw the Wildcats win 86–77. Miami's first win came on December 4, 1968, an 86–67 win over Bellarmine.

Seating

The arena's official capacity is listed as 9,200, Portable bleachers are installed at the north end of the court for the main student section. The south end of the court is reserved for the Pep Band and for the Red Alert student section.

The majority of the seating is located on the sides of the court. These are divided up into an upper and lower bowl. The seats in the lower bowl are a red fabric material, while the upper bowl are a brown color. A large video scoreboard hangs from the center of the arena with statistics.

One of the main complaints with the arena is that the fans are too far away from the action. The arena was built for multi-purpose use and not for athletics. Unlike many of the other arenas in the Mid-American Conference, fans are not on top of the court at Millett. Miami head coach Charlie Coles reflected on this in an interview with the Columbus Dispatch in 2007. "When you play at Millett the fans are so far away, and that has affected our student crowd." He added, "They don't feel like they can be an influence, and young people today like to be an influence. You can't get that momentum. We have to get a large crowd to have an impact of the home arena."

Men's basketball
Millett Hall is in its 39th season as the home of RedHawk men's basketball. Over the last 38 years, Miami has compiled a 361–113 record at Millett Hall, a winning percentage of .762. Since the start of the 1993-94 season, the RedHawks are 139–31 (.818) at Millett. Banners hang from the catwalks recognizing Miami's NCAA and NIT tournament appearances. Banners also hang recognizing Miami's 21 Mid-American Conference regular season championships, the first in 1952 and most recently in 2005. There are five retired jerseys at Millett Hall. They include: Ron Harper (34), Wayne Embry (23), Dick Walls (44), Darrell Hedric (86), and Wally Szczerbiak (32). Harper's jersey was the first to be retired, during halftime of his final home game in 1986.

Top ten crowds

Millett Hall records
Most Points:

Team- 123 vs. Midway 11-29-17

Individual- 40 Eric Newsome vs. Evansville 12-9-89

Most Combined Points:

212 (Miami 110, Evansville 102) 12-9-89

Field Goals:

Team- 48 vs. Findlay 1-30-74

Individual- 16 Larry Cole vs. Toledo 2-22-75

3-Point Field Goals:

Team- 14 vs. Nebraska 11-27-89; vs. Purdue 11-19-04

Individual- 9 Michael Bramos vs. Dayton 11-28-07

Free Throws

Team- 53 vs. Central Michigan 1-29-92

Individual- 17 Anthony Taylor vs. Wright State 12-18-99

Rebounds:

Team- 68 vs. Cleveland State 11-28-72

Individual- 23 Ron Harper vs. Central Michigan 2-6-86

Assists:

Team- 31 vs. Ball State 2-15-86

Individual- 17 Eddie Schilling vs. Kent State 2-4-87

Blocks:

Team-11 vs. Bowling Green 2-10-88

Individual- 7 Kevin Beard vs. Toledo 1-10-96; Ron Harper vs. Bowling Green 2-5-85

Steals:

Team- 18 vs. Centre 12-2-85

Individual- 7 Ron Harper vs. Marietta 12-1-84; Chuck Goodyear vs. Toledo 2-11-76; Damon Frierson vs. Ball State 2-27-99

Women's basketball
In 34 years at Millett the women's team has compiled a winning percentage of .683. During the 1981-82 season Miami went a perfect 10–0 at home. They set a record for home wins in a season with 12 during the 1996-97 season. The RedHawks have only suffered six losing seasons at Millett Hall. Mary Ann Myers (20) and Heather Cusick (5) are the two women's jerseys retired at Millett.

Millett Hall records
Most Points:

Team- 110 vs. Wright State 12-7-02

Individual- 37 Laurie Byrd vs. Eastern Michigan 2-12-81

Field Goals:

Team- 49 vs. Toledo 12-2-78

Individual- 17 Laurie Byrd vs. Eastern Michigan 2-12-81

3-Point Field Goals:

Team- 16 vs. Bowling Green 1-22-00

Individual- 9 Jamie Stewart vs. Bowling Green 1-22-00

Free Throws

Team- 44 vs. Central Michigan 1-3-98

Individual- 15 Hollie Nelsen vs. Central Michigan 1-3-98

Rebounds:

Team- 61 vs. Northern Illinois 1-19-85

Individual- 25 Leslie Schultz vs. Purdue 12-2-81

Assists:

Team- 34 vs. Western Illinois 3-11-82

Individual- 15 Nikki Kremer vs. Xavier 12-12-86

Blocks:

Team-10 vs. Northern Illinois 2-4-06

Individual- 8 Heidi Gillingham vs. Vanderbilt 2-15-92

Steals:

Team- 27 vs. Toledo 12-2-78

Individual- 10 Lindsay Austin vs. Bowling Green 2-3-04

Volleyball
The 2009 volleyball campaign will mark the 25th season in Millett Hall for women's volleyball. Prior to the 1985 season the volleyball team played at Withrow Court since they began play in 1974. The RedHawks enjoy a lot of success with a winning percentage of 66.6 at home. The longest home winning streak is 17, starting on September 12, 1998, and ending on September 4, 1999. The 1998 team went a perfect 12–0 against Mid-American Conference opponents. The largest crowd to watch volleyball at Millett came during the 1995 Volleyball Championship when over 1,000 fans attended.

Other events

Millett Hall has hosted many other events and speakers.

It also plays host to commencement exercises and concerts. A rather impressive list of entertainers and bands have performed at Millett. They include: Elton John, Simon and Garfunkel, Jethro Tull, Dave Matthews and Tim Reynolds, Widespread Panic, The Allman Brothers Band, Tony Bennett, Bill Cosby, Andy Williams, Ray Charles, Barry Manilow, James Taylor, Sting, Bob Dylan, Phil Lesh and Friends, Charlie Daniels, Gladys Knight, John Cougar Mellencamp, Don Henley, Yes, Hootie and the Blowfish, Dave Chappelle, Jay Leno, Lupe Fiasco, Three 6 Mafia Bruce Springsteen, Fleetwood Mac, R.E.M., Bob Hope, George Burns, and 50 Cent.

It was also the site of Miami University's bicentennial ball held on February 21, 2009, as the university celebrated the 200th anniversary of its charter signed February 17, 1809.

See also
 List of NCAA Division I basketball arenas

References

External links
 Millett Hall official page
 ROTC
 Red Alert
 Men's Basketball Webpage
 Women's Basketball Webpage
 Volleyball Webpage
 Miami University Bicentennial site

College basketball venues in the United States
Miami RedHawks basketball
Basketball venues in Ohio
Buildings and structures of Miami University